Erronea pyriformis, common name the pear-shaped cowrie, is a species of sea snail, a cowry, a marine gastropod mollusk in the family Cypraeidae, the cowries.

Description
They are pear-shaped, with a very variable pattern. The surface is smooth and shiny, their basic color is usually whitish or greenish, with many small brown and one or two transversal brown bands or brown patches. The base and the margins are whitish with some brown spots, while the columellar teeth are dark brown. Erronea pyriformis is quite similar to Contradusta pulchella, but the last has longer reddish-brown teeth. In the living cowries mantle and foot are well developed, with external antennae. The lateral flaps of the mantle may hide completely the shell surface and may be quickly retracted into the shell opening.

Distribution
This species occurs from Western Pacific to Indian Ocean, in the sea along India, Sri Lanka, Philippines, Malaysia, Indonesia and  Australia.

Habitat

References
 Lorenz F. & Hubert A. (2000) A guide to worldwide cowries. Edition 2. Hackenheim: Conchbooks. 584 pp

External links
  Biolib
 
 Ctpraea

pyriformis
Gastropods described in 1824
Taxa named by John Edward Gray